The FIBA Asia Cup Most Valuable Player Award is a FIBA award given every two years, to the Most Outstanding player throughout the tournament.

Winners

References

Most Valuable Player
Basketball trophies and awards